Diocese of Bhopal may refer to:
Roman Catholic Archdiocese of Bhopal
Diocese of Bhopal (Church of North India)